Lieutenant-General Thomas Howard, 2nd Earl of Effingham (1714 – 19 November 1763), styled Lord Howard from 1731 to 1743, was a British nobleman and Army officer, the son of Francis Howard, 1st Earl of Effingham.

Lord Howard was appointed a deputy lieutenant of the West Riding of Yorkshire on 19 February 1734. On 7 January 1739, he was commissioned a guidon in the 2nd Troop of Horse Grenadier Guards, of which his father was then captain and colonel. He was promoted first lieutenant and captain on 10 May 1740. Upon his father's death in February 1743, he succeeded him as Earl of Effingham, and subsequently as Deputy Earl Marshal. On 11 April 1743, Effingham was made first lieutenant and lieutenant-colonel in the 2nd Troop of Horse Guards. He married Elizabeth Beckford, daughter of Peter Beckford and sister of William Beckford on 14 February 1745, by whom he had children including:
Thomas Howard, 3rd Earl of Effingham (1747–1791)
Richard Howard, 4th Earl of Effingham (1748–1816)

Effingham was appointed an aide-de-camp to the King on 20 August 1749, and received the colonelcy of the 34th Regiment of Foot on 2 December 1754. He was promoted major-general on 15 January 1758 and lieutenant-general on 22 February 1760. On 30 October 1760, he left the 34th to become Captain and Colonel of the 1st Troop Horse Grenadier Guards. Effingham died three years later and was succeeded by his eldest son, Thomas.

References

External links

 

1714 births
1763 deaths
18th-century British Army personnel
34th Regiment of Foot officers
British Army lieutenant generals
British Life Guards officers
Deputy Lieutenants of the West Riding of Yorkshire
Earls in the Peerage of Great Britain
English people of Irish descent
Thomas Howard, 02nd Earl of Effingham
Earls of Effingham
Barons Howard of Effingham